The 2005 Montana Grizzlies football team represented the University of Montana in the 2005 NCAA Division I-AA football season. The Grizzlies were led by third-year head coach Bobby Hauck and played their home games on campus at Washington–Grizzly Stadium in  Missoula.

Schedule

References

Montana
Montana Grizzlies football seasons
Big Sky Conference football champion seasons
Montana Grizzlies football